Soot is the black, impure carbon particles resulting from the incomplete combustion of a hydrocarbon.

Soot may also refer to:
 Engebret Soot (1786-1859), Norwegian engineer
 Soot (software), a language manipulation and optimization framework
Wilbur Soot (born 1996), a British internet personality, Twitch streamer and singer-songwriter

See also
 Soot Canal
 Sooty (disambiguation)